Paracupta helopioides is a species of beetles in the family Buprestidae.

Subspecies
 Paracupta helopioides antennata Obenberger, 1928
 Paracupta helopioides helopioides (Boisduval, 1835)

Description

Distribution
This species can be found in Solomon Islands.

References

Buprestidae
Beetles described in 1835